Sardinella brachysoma (deepbody sardinella, Indian herring, or Indian sprat) is a species of ray-finned fish in the genus Sardinella.

Footnotes 
 

brachysoma
Fish described in 1852